General John Ramsay Stuart  (18 June 1811 – 18 October 1889) was a British Army officer who became Commander-in-Chief, Scotland.

Military career
Stuart was commissioned into the Royal Scots Fusiliers and served with his regiment at the Battle of Alma in September 1854 and at the Battle of Balaclava in October 1854 before taking command of his regiment and leading it at the Battle of Inkerman in November 1854 and at the Siege of Sebastopol in Winter 1854 during the Crimean War. He went on to command the troops in the North British District from in 1875 before retiring in 1878.

Stuart was also appointed Regimental Colonel of the 54th Regiment of Foot in 1880, continuing as Colonel of the 1st Battalion of the Dorsetshire Regiment from 1881 to his death.

References

 

British Army generals
1811 births
1889 deaths
Companions of the Order of the Bath